Bob or Bobby Morgan may refer to:
 Bob Morgan (baseball) (born 1947), American baseball player and coach
 Bobby Morgan (baseball) (born 1926), American baseball infielder
 Bob Morgan (diver) (born 1967), Welsh diver
 Bob Morgan (American football) (1930–1991), American football offensive tackle
 Bob Morgan (priest) (1928–2011),  Church in Wales vicar and Welsh Labour council leader 
 Bobby Morgan (Canadian football) (born 1940), running back
 Bob Morgan (Illinois politician), member of the Illinois House of Representatives
 Bob Morgan (costume designer), American costume designer

See also
Robert Morgan (disambiguation)